Unity Reed High School is a public secondary school in Bull Run, Prince William County, Virginia, near the city of Manassas.  It was formerly known as Stonewall Jackson High School.  In May 2007, Newsweek magazine ranked Unity Reed 530th in the nation on its annual list of "Best High Schools in America". In 2001, Time named Unity Reed as a High School of the Year.

Administration 
The principal of Unity Reed High School is Richard Nichols. He has been the principal since 2007.

Naming controversy
The school was named after Stonewall Jackson, a Confederate general.  In 2017, the Prince William County Public Schools (PWCS) Board was considering renaming the school as part of a shift away from naming schools after Confederate leaders.  In 2020, the PWCS Superintendent released an open letter saying, "We can no longer represent the Confederacy in our schools".

On June 29, 2020, the school board voted to rename the school to "Unity Reed High School", honoring Arthur Reed, who served as a security assistant at the school.

Demographics 
As of the 2016–2017 school year, the student body demographics were:
Hawaiian/Pacific Isl.: 0.2%
Hispanic of any race: 56.5%
Am. Indian/Alaskan: 0.4%
Asian: 5.7%
Black/African-Am.: 15.5%
White 17.2% 
Two or More race: 4.5%

See also
Prince William County Public Schools
Unity Braxton Middle School

References

External links 
 

Educational institutions established in 1972
Public high schools in Virginia
Schools in Prince William County, Virginia
1972 establishments in Virginia
Stonewall Jackson
Name changes due to the George Floyd protests